Wattrelos (archaic ) is a commune in the Nord department in the Nord-Pas de Calais region of northern France. It is located on the border with Belgium, northeast of the city of Lille. The fifth-largest component of the Métropole Européenne de Lille, Wattrelos borders the communes of Roubaix, Tourcoing and Leers in France and the communes of Mouscron and Estaimpuis in Belgium.

Population

Heraldry

Twin towns – sister cities

Wattrelos is twinned with:

 Eschweiler, Germany
 Guarda, Portugal
 Köthen, Germany
 Mohács, Hungary
 Siemianowice Śląskie, Poland

See also
Communes of the Nord department

References

External links

 Official website

Communes of Nord (French department)
French Flanders